Nuoxi Yao, or Nuoxihua 𦰡溪话, is a Kam–Sui language of Nuoxi Township , Dongkou County, Hunan Province, China. Even though they are classified as ethnic Yao people by the Chinese government, the Nuoxi Yao speak a Kam–Sui language closely related to Dong. Shi (2015:132) considers Nuoxi Yao to have split off from Dong about 600 years.

Names
The Nuoxi Yao call themselves the 1 (Shi 2015:107) or 2 1 (Shi 2015:125), and refer to their own language as 1 (Shi 2015:107). The town of Nuoxi  (the first syllable is pronounced nuó in Mandarin (Shi 2015:107)) is referred to in the local Hunanese dialect as 2 1.

Demographics
Shi (2015:107) estimates a total of 2,500 speakers and 5,000 ethnic Yao in Nuoxi Township. According to the Shaoyang Prefecture Gazetteer (1997), language varieties closely related to Southern Kam are spoken in Nuoxi , Dongkou County (which had 4,280 ethnic Yao in 1982 (Chen 2013:39)) and Lianmin , Suining County.

The Suining County Gazetteer [绥宁县志] (1997) documents the variety of Lianmin Yao as spoken in Xiaohuang , Tianluoxuan Village , Lianmin Ethnic Miao and Yao Township , Suining County , Hunan Province, China. It is closely related to Nuoxi Yao.

History
Chen Qiguang (2013:39) reports that the ancestors of Nuoxihua  speakers had migrated to their current location from Tianzhu, Liping, and Yuping counties of southeastern Guizhou during the early 15th century. According to Shi Lin (2015:126), the Nuoxi Yao had migrated from Gaoyi Township , Huitong County , Hunan Province in 1403.

See also
Hunan Kam-Sui languages comparative vocabulary list (contains lexical data of Nuoxi Yao and Lianmin Yao)

References

Long Mingyao [龙明耀]. 1984. "The Nuoxi Yao language and its relationship to Dong" [𦰡溪瑶语与侗语的关系]. In Guizhou Minzu Yanjiu [贵州民族研究] 1984, no. 3, p. 243-253.
Shi Lin [石林]. 2015. Three language varieties of the Hunan-Guizhou-Guangxi border region [湘黔桂边区的三个族群方言岛]. Beijing: China Social Sciences Academy Press [中国社会科学出版社]. 

Languages of China
Kam–Sui languages